Okitipupa is a Local Government Area in Nigeria and part of the Ikale-speaking nation in Ondo State. Okitipupa Local Government headquarters is located in Okitipupa township with a university, Ondo State University of Science and Technology (OSUSTECH) which commenced academic sessions in 2010–11.

Ìkálè or Old Ìkálè Local Government is part of the Yoruba tribe of Ondo state in Nigeria which was originally Ikaleland and combination of the present Okitipupa Local Government and Irele Local Government before the two local governments were split into two namely: Ìrèlè local government and Okitipupa local government.

Name 
"Okitipupa" town was formerly known as Ode-Idepe. The name "Okitipupa" is originated from the elevation of the town, migration of the people to the virgin area and the red colour of the soil (pupain Ikale and Yoruba dialects). Okiti means "hilly land". Okiti-pupa is derived from the Ikale Yoruba word okiti (hilly) and pupa (red) which became a name used by people travelling from other communities to trade in the central market of the town (Okitipupa). Today, the inhabitants use the names of Okitipupa and Idepe interchangeably.

Okitipupa has always been the central town for the inhabitants of Ondo South senatorial district of Ondo state, comprising okitipupa, Irele, Ilaje, Ese-Odo, Odigbo and Ile-Oluji/Okeigbo local governments respectively due to the presence of basic amenities. Okitipupa town is the administrative headquarters of Okitipupa local government with neighbouring communities such as: Ode-Erinje, Ikoya, Ode-Aye, Ayila, Araromi, Igbotako, Ilutitun, Igbodigo, Iju- Odo, Igbisin-Oloto,  Erekiti, Iju- Oke, Omotosho, Akinfosile, Igodan-lisa, Okunmo, Ayeka, Ode-idepe  and others. It was a district in colonial times, before Nigeria's independence in 1960. It has a university, a specialist hospital, several private hospitals, a Magistrate court, a High court, Nigerian Police Force Area command, an Army barrack, commercial banks, a telephone exchange, and numerous primary and secondary schools.

Natives of Ikale are predominantly farmers. The major cash crops are oil-palm, rubber and cassava. They also cultivate yams, beans, okra, pepper, melon and vegetables. Staple food includes but is not limited to baked cassava, popularly known as Pupuru, yam, rice, yam flour and cassava flakes (garri) among others.

It has a market that has been a major shopping center for traders from all Yoruba land and beyond since pre-colonial. A modern market was built by the administration of Chief Herbert Kuewumi in 1979 when he was the executive chairman of the Old Okitipupa Local government before the administration of the then-governor Olusegun Mimiko of Ondo state rebuilt the market in 2009. A larger percentage of the roads in the town were constructed by the administration of Olusegun Agagu when he was governor of Ondo state.
Major industries located in the town include the Okitipupa Oil Palm Plc and Oluwa Glass Factory (both of which were listed on the Nigerian Stock Exchange. Palm-oil and rubber plantations litter the landscape.

History 

In about 1502, there was a development in Benin Kingdom, Oba Esigie was on the throne and since succession to the throne was from father to son, he was worried that he had no male child to ascend the throne after his death. He married many wives so as to produce a male child. The premonition was that some forces were behind his not having male children. One of his wives conceived and went into hiding. He gave birth to a male child in the morning but at that time, many people had gone to their places of work. Automatically, the male child should reign after him. Before he could make an Oba, certain rites were to be performed. They put all the things: crown, sekere, horsetail, beads as a mark of an Oba before the child.
Towards evening, when people were returning from their various places of work, another wife of the Oba gave birth to a male child and people were happy, and started jubilating to herald in the new Oba. News now came that a male child had been given birth to the Oba in the morning but kept in secrecy Abodi.

The two male children grew up in the palace. The Oba foresaw problems as to who was to ascend to the throne after him. He advised the elder male child to go across Owena River to establish his own kingdom. Abodi left with some chiefs in Benin and came to the western side of the Owena. He first settled at Arogbo–Ile. While leaving the place, he asked Larogbo to take charge of Arogbo–Ile. He proceeded to Irele and settled there for a while. This first Abodi is called Abodi Jabado. He reigned for a long period before joining his ancestors. His son, called Tufewa, reigned after him. People that were with the Abodi were called Abodi people. The settlement of Abodi in each of the places he settled was called Ikoya. Tufewa went to Ile–Ife to learn the art of governance because he had not learnt the intricacies of palace administration in Benin.

It was also recorded that Esigie sent him to Ooni in Ile–Ife. He was there for three years. At the end of his third year, the Ooni gave Abodi benedictions. He made him to kneel down in a circle marked with white chalk and asked him to carry out these rites in his kingdom/Domain. Abodi came home with this chalk. This led to the use of white chalk (Efun) which is used to make inscriptions or marks on the ground (meaning) Ikale. That is what we bear today. Without prejudice to anybody, some people say we covered the land “a ka ile yi”. While some people claimed that a man was living beside the Owena River named Aale, and so his village was called Aale. From the three schools of thought, we presume that the act of using a white chalk to make an inscription on the ground to mean Ikale is the most acceptable.
The Chiefs that accompanied him from Benin and those that joined him later were given districts to administer. These chiefs were called Olojas. They were given recognitions as Obas in 1979. meanwhile, Abodi gave them titles and they were responsible to him. Today, to a large extent they are autonomous in the administration of their areas. There is no time that the Ikales are nine or their rulers were nine. But the idea of Ikale mehan came during the colonial era. The reasons were best known to the colonial masters. Ajagba, Ujosun and Akotogbo were administered by Benin confederation. Two reasons were advanced for carving out the three: (i) They spoke Benin language (ii) They were too distant from Ikoya administration. One needs to say that if the colonial masters had understood the origin of the Ikales, they would not have carved out these three areas and put them under Benin Administration.

Originally, there was: Larogbo of Akotogbo; Oluhogbo of Ujosun, Ahaba of Ajagba, Laragunsin of Iyansan, Odogbo of Omi, Olofun of Irele, Halu/Lapoki of Ode-Aye, Jagun of Idepe, Obagberume of Igbodigo, Lumure of Ayeka, Orungberuwa of Erinje, Olura of Oloto/Igbinsin, Rebuja of Osooro, and Onipe of Ubu.

Some of the rulers mentioned above are offsprings of other royal fathers. For example, Jagun is an offspring of Larogbo, Rebuja is an offspring of Lumure. Due to lack of contact, Onipe was lost to Ijebu area. Today, in addition to the aforementioned Obas, we have: Norogun of Ayede, Olu of Igodan/Okunmo, Majuwa of Morubodo Kingdom, and Orofun of Iju – Odo. Ikoya is very important in the history of Ikale development. Abodi Jabado was asked to move out and found his kingdom. Esigie gave Abodi all the paraphernalia of office. Sword (Uda) was left out. Oba Esigie was confused with whom to give; either Oba Abodi or Orogbua. Oba Esigie then called his palace chiefs to consider whom to be given the sword. The palace chiefs made two of them to contest for the "Uda". The sword was thrown up for them to catch.
In the process, Abodi gripped the handle while Orogbua held the blade. Orogbua's hand was cut and Abodi won the contest and had the "Uda". Oba Esigie told Abodi to use the sword to ward off attacks, aggressions and insults. In other words, the uda was given to Abodi to ward off enemies (ki o fi ko iya) To confirm this, Abodi is the only Oba that bears the appellation, "Ogun Olugba uda…"
Anywhere Abodi settles is called Ikoya. He settled in Atijere, Ode, Lagos, etc. It was Abodi Kugbayigbe who came to found the present Ikoya. Ikoya is a shifting settlement along with its civilization, culture, custom, ethics and norms.

In those days, there was a lot of human sacrifice. Only the relations of Abodi were spared. Strangers were used for these sacrifices. This made them move from Ikoya Kingdom because that time, to stay at Ikoya was between life and death. The Ikales because of their good administration, their neighbours feared them. There were two events when we had clashes. Alake wanted to override Onipe. Onipe called on Abodi and the force of Alake was forced to retreat. It was not directly between Alake and Ikale. It was later that Alake discovered that Abodi assisted Onipe but Abodi had already moved away from there. Ondos and Ikales fought wars though not with the entire Ikale but with some districts like Aye, Irele having boundaries with them. In each of these wars, Ikales always emerged victorious because the entire Ikale fought as a unit.

In one of the wars, the Ondo warriors were decisively rooted which led to the immediate death of the then Osemawe who could not stand the defeat (O si igba). Apart from external wars, Ikales had internal conflicts between Osooro and Idepe and Ayeka. We had no war with the Ilajes, Ijaws, and the Ijebus. The war we had with Larogbo was a very critical one in which Erinje was grossly affected which made them to hide in a place called Aluma. Apart from this, there were no serious wars like Kiriji and others. The present chieftaincy titles practiced in Ikale was brought by Abodi Tufewa when he traveled to Ile – Ife. The first set of Ijama were Ligha, Jomo, Petu, Yasere, Odunwo and Isowa, headed by Lema. They were established in all Ikale areas by the second Abodi. In most Ikale areas today, these six chiefs form the leadership of Ijama. It is not mandatory that you have all of them. In some towns, they are Egharepara. Ijama was banished in 1919 but resuscitated in 1930's because Ijama is the organ of administration. The hierarchical setup is: Oba – Ijama – Ijoye – Omaja.lkale land covered three local government in ondo state and part of Ogun waterside Local government Ogun state.
Okitipupa local government.
Irele Local government.
Odigbo Local government.
Ogun waterside Local government.

Foundation
Ikale is one of the several dialects spoken by the Yoruba of Nigeria.
The name also refers to the people who speak the dialect.
This subgroup is made up of fourteen communities in the southwestern part of Ondo state of Nigeria.
They share boundaries with the Ilaje, Ijo Apoi, and Ijo Arogbo to the south; Edo state to the east and Ogun state to the west. Ikale ccommunties include Ikoya-Ikale, Ode-Irele, Ode-Omi, Igbodigo, Ayeka, Idepe-Okitipupa), Ode-Aye, Erinje, Osooro and Igbinsin-Olot, Akotogbo, Ajagba, Iyansan and Iju-Osun and also cover many towns and villages in odigbo local government (Agbabu, Lafelepe, okeoluwa, Sheba, mulekangbo, modebiayo, Lafe-lepa,Egbe,Ago-Lagaba,Ago-Lowo,Ayetedo, ojabale, Ago-alaye, Ajebamidele, Ajebambo, koseru, Ayesan, kajola, onipetesi, imorun, sokoto, Ayetoro, Araromi rubber estate, Basola, Agirifon, Ayetunmbo ode-Ore, I.
These last four communities were formerly group under the Benin confederation traces of Edo language and culture show very clearly in their ways of ife. Osooro is a conglomeration of igbotako, ilutitun, iju-odo, iju-oke, erekiti,Ilado,Agbetu and omotosoo town.
The ikale also have kindred communities in parts of Ogun state, viz., ayede, ayila, arafen and mobolorundo
While some ikale communities claim direct descent from ife, others claim Benin, or Ugbo descent, and a few others elsewhere. Oral tradition confirms that there were migrations from ife ooye before the Benin contact of the sixteenth century, which tend to link ikale dynasty to oba esigie.  According to the history, it occurred during the edi festival, an annual festival in ile-ife. For seven days, he claimed, the priest would spend mats on the floor on which all necessary rites would be performed. The mats would be removed on the seventh day, making the end of the festival, when the mats are removed, elders would say ‘’a ka ile’’ according to the history that was the day people now known as ikale migrated from ile-ife.
The people never settled in the same spot, when they met each other as they moved about, they exchanged greetings and asked from each other the day they left ile-ife. In response, they said that they left ile-ife ‘’ni ojo ikale’’ the day when the mats were removed from the ground. Since then, they have started calling themselves ikale. According to history it was claimed that ikale refers to an incident that happened during the second abodi's visit to ile-ife. Before he left ile-ife, he knelt down inside a circle of chalk to receive blessings from Ooni of ife. Ikale is said to derive from the drawing of circle with the hand, ika, on the ground, ile.
However, the genuineness of these migration theory riddles remains to be determined. What is clear that the culture of the ikale and the edo are relatively similar. Moreover, both ikale and ilaje oral traditions emphasize their mutual relationship with ife in their frequent mention of ife in their music and in their propitiation.

Sport

Government of Okitipupa
The Government of Okitipupa Local Government is defined and authorized under the Ondo State Constitution,
Government of Ondo State is in practice the responsibility of county governments, such as the Local Government of Okitipupa. The Local government provides countywide services such as elections and voter registration, law enforcement, jails, vital records, property records, tax collection, public health, health care, and social services. In addition the County serves as the local government for all unincorporated areas.

 Politics Of Okitipupa

Geography 
Ikale occupies a large area along the southwestern part of Ondo state and, sharing land borders with Ilaje Local Government to the south; Edo state to the east  Ogun State the west; and Ondo Local Government to the north. The postal code of the area is 350.

Religions

List of Obas of Okitipupa 

Irele Local government

List of Obas of Irele

List of Ikale Obas in Odigbo Local gov't

Education

Colleges and university

There is only one public university within the town limits:| Ondo State University Of Science and Technology  (OSUSTECH).

There are numerous additional colleges and universities outside the town limits in the Okitipupa Local Government Area, including the Federal University of Technology(FUTA), Adeyemi College Of Education (ACE) consortium, which includes the most selective liberal arts colleges in the Nigeria, and the Adekunle Ajasin University (AAUA),

Alternative and citywide schools

Public primary schools

St. John's RCM, Okitipupa
St. Mary's RCM Okitipupa
L.A Primary School, Okitipupa
St. Joseph CAC, Okitipupa
Caring Heart Mega Primary School, Ayeka, Okitipupa
Caring Heart Mega Primary School, Ilutitun
St. Banarbas Anglican School, Ode-Erinje
Methodist Primary School, Okitipupa
St. Paul's Anglican Primary School, Okitipupa
Ebenezer UNA Primary School, Okitipupa
The Apostolic Primary School, Okitipupa
Methodist Primary School, Idepe Okitipupa
St. Edward's RCM Idepe Okitipupa
St. Mary's C/S Primary School, Okitipupa
St. Dominic's Mega Ayeka Igbidigo
St. Raphael's C/S Oke-Igbala
Methodist Primary School, Araromi Ayeka
Methodist Primary School, Igodan Lisa
St. Patrick's RCM, Okunmo
Methodist Primary School, Ode-Erinje
St. Joseph RCM, Ode-Erinje
C.P.S Ode-Igbodigo
Ansarul Islam Primary School, Okitipupa
L.A. Primary School, Farm Settlement
Army Children School I, Okitipupa
Baptist Day School, Okitipupa
L.A Practising School, Ode-Aye
C. P.S Orokin Aye
St. Christopher Anglican, School, Ode-Aye
St. Gregory RCM Ode-Aye
C.A.C Primary School, Ode-Aye
Baptist Day School, Ode-Aye
Methodist Primary School, Ode-Aye
St. Mathias RCM, Ode-Aye
Methodist Primary School, Okerisa, Aye
L.A. Primary School Igboluwoye Aye
L.A. Primary School, Igbo-Odofin
C.P.S Agbaje, Aye
L.A. Primary School, Moboro Aye
L. A. Primary School, Ikoya
St. Joseph's RCM Ikoya
St. Paul's Anglican School, Ikoya
Methodist Primary School, Abusoro Idepe
L.A Primary School, Igedege
Methodist Primary School, Igorisa-Aye
Army Children School II, Okitipupa
L.A. Primary School, Ilutitun
Ebenezer Anglican School, Ilutitun
St. Paul's C/S Primary School, Ilutitun
St. Peter's Primary School, Ilutitun
St. Augustine's RCM, School, Ilutitun
Methodist Primary School, Ilutitun
C/S Zion Primary School, Ilutitun
Baptist Day School, Igbotako
St. Mathew's Anglican School, Oloto
St. Benedict RCM Igbisin
C.P.S Oagunte, Ikoya
C. P. S Eleron, Ilutitun
ST. John's Anglican, Igbotako
St. Pius RCM Igbotako
Methodist Primary School, Igbotako
Baptist Day School, Igbotako
St. Stephen's Anglican, Igbotako
St. Paul's Anglican Erekiti-Luwoye
L.A Primary School, Ilu-Odo
St. Paul's Anglican School, Ilu-Odo
St. Mathew's Anglican School, Ilu-Oke Market
L.A. Primary School, Sogbon, Igbotako
L. A. Primary School, Ilado-Market
St. Paul's Anglican School, Ilado, Olowosusi
St. Columcille's R.C.M Irowa
St. Benedict's R.C.M Iwada
L.A. Primary School, Agbetu
St. Andrew's Anglican School, Abusoro, Igbotako
St. Andrew's R.C.M Ijuoke, Market
L.A. Primary School, Erekiti, Jomo
L.A. Primary School, Idiobilayo
L.A. Pry School Ajewole Igbotako
St. Anthony's R.C.M, Omotoso
L.A. Primary School, Akinfosile Junction
C.P.S Mobolorunduro
C.P.S Wakajaye, Idera
C.P.S Ayetoro I
C. P. S Primary School, Adewinle
C.P.S Ayetoro II
L.A. Primary School, Okegbe
C. P. S Idogun Omowole
Gudu Primary School, Igbodigo
St. Ezekiel C/S Primary School, Okititpupa
St. Andrew's R.C.M Ijuoke, Market

Public secondary schools

Idepe High School, Idepe-Okitipupa
Igodan Lisa/Okunmo High School, Igodan Lisa
Manuwa Memorial Grammar School, Iju-Odo
Moribodo College, Ilutitun-Osoro *Comprehensive High School, Ilutitun Osoro
Idepe High School,
Ofedepe Comprehensive High School, okitipupa
Stella Maris College, okitipupa
Community High School, Erekiti-Luwoye
Community Grammar school,Igbotako
Ayeka Igbodigo High School, igbodigo
Erinje Grammar School, Ode-Erinje
Ikoya Grammar School, Ikoya
Lubokun Comprehensive High School, Igbotako
Moribodo College, Ilutitun-Osooro
Omotoso Community Grammar School, Omotoso
Ogundubuja High School, Okitipupa
Community High School, Mobolorunduro-Okitipupa
Ikale High School, Igbisin-Oloto
Danike High School, Ode-Aye
Comprehensive High School, Ode-Aye
Unity Secondary School,Ode-Aye
Layelu High School, Ode-Aye         *Baptist Grammar School, Ode-Aye

Private secondary schools

Ultimate International High School, Ode-Aye
Victory High School, Ilutitun, Osoro
Deal Prospects High School, Okitipupa
Success Secondary School, Okitipupa
Trinity College, Olorintedo
Saint Josiah's College, Okitipupa
Christ Unity High School, Ode-Aye, Okitipupa
Emmanuel Royal College, Okitipupa
Esther-Kawe Secondary School, Okitipupa
Wisdom Assembly College, Ode-Ayeka
Atoyebi Memorial Secondary School, Wakajaye, Okitipupa
Ibukun olu C.A.C secondary school, okitipua
Corner Stone Girls’ College, Okitipupa
Mercuri Model Secondary School, Ikoya
Sarah International College, Okitipupa
Holy Trinity College, Okitipupa
St,william secondary school,okitipupa
Optimum victory college, okitipupa
Elisiry International High School, Okitipupa
Goshenland Academy School, Okitipupa

Military Base

 19 Battalion Naquora Barracks, Okitipupa,

Ikale Divisions
IKALE KINGDOM

Akinfosile
Ayeka
Ayetedo Aye
Ayede
Ayila
Agbetu
Araromi Ayeka
Abusoro Idepe
Abusoro
Agbaje Aye
Agbabu Aye
Agric
Batedo Aye
Ode-Erinje
Erekiti
Ikoya-Ikale
Igodan-Lisa
Igbotako
Igbodigo
Iwada
Irowa
Ilu-Titun
Igodan
Igorisa-Aye
Iju-Oke
Igboluwoye-Aye
Igbo-Odofin
Ilado
Iju-Odo
Igbinsin
Idera
Idiobilayo
umoboro Aye
umobi Aye
Epewi Aye
oke-Idebi village
Luwoye
Igedege
Idogun Omowole
Jeremiah
Okitipupa (Rural)
Ode-Idepe
Omotoso
Oke-Igbala
Ode-Aye
Olowosusi
Orokin Aye
Olorintedo
Okunmo
Igbo Odofin Aye
Oloto
Ominla
Mobolorunduro
Wakajaye
Ago-Alaye-Ikale               
Basola-Ikale                         *Ajebamdele-Ikale          *Ajebambo-Ikale 
kajola-Ikale               *Ayetoro-Ikale                  *Ore Town

Notable people
 Akintunde Aduwo – Former Governor Western Region, Navy Vice Admiral
 Olusegun Agagu – Former Governor of Ondo state
 [ Jimoh Ibrahim  ] Lawyer and Business man]

References

Local Government Areas in Ondo State
Towns in Yorubaland
Articles containing video clips